William Fleming (February 6, 1851 - 1933) was a member of the Wisconsin State Assembly in 1879 and 1880. He was a Democrat.

Biography 
Fleming was born on February 6, 1851, in Emmet, Dodge County, Wisconsin, to John and Catherine (Sweeney) Fleming, who settled in the town in 1844. Professions he held include schoolteacher. He was elected to represent Dodge County in the Wisconsin State Assembly in 1879 and 1880. He was also the deputy clerk of the Dodge County court from 1882 to 1884 and the Dodge County clerk from 1884 to 1886. In 1887, he was stationed in Fort Wrangel, Alaska, as a deputy collector of customs. After he returned from Alaska, he moved to Oconomowoc, Wisconsin in December 1893, and became a lawyer. He died in 1933 and was buried there.

References

People from Emmet, Dodge County, Wisconsin
Schoolteachers from Wisconsin
1851 births
1933 deaths
Democratic Party members of the Wisconsin State Assembly